The 2018 Rugby Europe Women's Championship was the 22nd edition of Rugby Europe's top division competition for women's national rugby union teams, and the tenth such tournament for which the European Championship title was awarded. The tournament was held in Belgium from 27 February to 3 March 2018 as a knockout competition, with matches played at Brussels and Waterloo.  won the championship to take its third European title and second in a row.

Format

The format was a four team semifinal bracket, with the teams seeded 1 and 2 meeting the teams seeded 4 and 3 respectively. A final for the title was played between the two winners and a match for third place was played by the defeated semifinal teams. All competitions took place at the Stade du Pachy in Waterloo except for the final held at the Petit Heysel in Brussels.

Results

Semi-finals

3rd Place

Final

See also
 2018–19 Rugby Europe Women's Trophy
 Rugby Europe Women's Championship
 Women's international rugby union § 2018

References

2018
2018 rugby union tournaments for national teams
2017–18 in European women's rugby union
2018
Rugby union in Belgium